Gerenzano is a comune (municipality) in the Province of Varese in the Italian region Lombardy, located about  northwest of Milan and about  southeast of Varese.

Gerenzano borders the following municipalities: Cislago, Rescaldina, Rovello Porro, Saronno, Turate, Uboldo.

Transports 
Gerenzano is served by train transportation with Gerenzano-Turate station, situated on the line connecting Varese and Laveno Mombello to Milan. This line is operated by FNM.

Education and culture 
Gerenzano has two public primary schools (one entitled to Pope Giovanni XXIII and one to G.P. Clerici) and one public middle school (entitled to the Italian scientist Enrico Fermi). There are no high schools in the comune.

A public library is also present in the territory, along with a public auditorium.

Sports 
In Gerenzano are located the following sport teams:

 Gruppo Sportivo Gerenzano, Twirling
 Polisportiva Salus Gerenzano, Football, Volleyball, Basketball and other activities 
 A.S.D Gerenzanese Calcio, Football

References

Cities and towns in Lombardy